Peter Alfred Gorer FRS (14 April 1907 (London)–1961) was a British immunologist, pathologist and geneticist who pioneered the field of transplant immunology.

Peter Gorer was born in London to Edgar (drowned in the 1915 sinking of RMS Lusitania) and Rachel née Cohen Gorer. He died of lung cancer in 1961.

Education and work institutions
He was educated at Charterhouse. He graduated from Guy's Hospital, London in 1929 and then studied genetics under J.B.S. Haldane at University College, London. From 1933 to 1940 Gorer worked at the Lister Institute before returning to Guy's Hospital to work as a pathologist.

Research
Gorer is credited with the co-discovery of histocompatibility antigens and the elucidation of their genetic regulation. Together with George Snell, he helped discover the murine histocompatibility 2 locus, or H-2, which is analogous to the human leukocyte antigen.  Gorer also identified antigen II and determined its role in transplant tissue rejection.

Awards

Elected a Fellow of the Royal Society in 1960.
1975 Cancer Research Institute William B. Coley Award

See also
C.C. Little
Major histocompatibility complex

References

1907 births
1961 deaths
People educated at Charterhouse School
Alumni of University College London
Physicians of Guy's Hospital
English geneticists
British immunologists
Deaths from lung cancer
Fellows of the Royal Society
20th-century British medical doctors